Hierophis is a genus of snake in the family Colubridae. 
It contains the following species:
 Balkan whip snake (Hierophis gemonensis)
 Cyprus whip snake (Hierophis cypriensis)
 Green whip snake (Hierophis viridiflavus)

 
Snake genera
Taxonomy articles created by Polbot